Thomas Clark (1775–1859) was a Canterbury shoemaker (cordwainer) and a prolific composer of West Gallery music, especially for the Nonconformist churches of the South East of England. Sally Drage, writing in the New Grove Dictionary of Music and Musicians, notes that he was 'particularly influential as the composer of early Sunday School collections'.

Clark was born in St Peter's parish in Canterbury and baptized on 5 February 1775. He was apprenticed as a shoemaker to his father, William Clark, and became a Freeman of the City of Canterbury in 1796 on completion of his apprenticeship as he was the son of a Freeman.

He married Anne Ledger in St George's Church, Canterbury, in November 1806.  He took over the family business on his father's death in 1823. He retired from business in about 1842-3. He died in Canterbury on 30 May 1859, aged 84.

The best-known of his hymn tunes is Cranbrook: it was originally set to the words 'Grace 'tis a charming sound' written by Philip Doddridge, and published in Clark's first book A Sett of Psalm & Hymn Tunes [1805]. Cranbrook was later used as a tune for the Christmas hymn While shepherds watched their flocks by night and is now better known as the tune of the Yorkshire song On Ilkla Moor Baht 'at.

Two other tunes by Clark were included in the 1933 Methodist Hymn Book with Tunes: they are Crediton (tune 565), which was first published in Clark's Second Set of Psalm Tunes ... with symphonies & an instrumental bass, adapted to the use of country choirs [c. 1807], and Warsaw (tune 606), which was first published in his Third Set of Psalm & Hymn Tunes [1807].

Publications
(from Tony Singleton's article)
12 sets of Psalm & Hymn Tunes, 1805 to 1821
Twelve Tunes in Peculiar Metre, ca.1810
9 sets of Psalm Tunes from 1805 to ca.1825 (the third set contains a Magnificat and Nunc Dimittis)
Te Deum Laudamus and Jubilate Deo, ca.1808
Several anthems published singly from ca.1808 onwards
Sacred Gleaner, ca.1826-7
Congregational Harmonist in 4 volumes from 1828 - ca.1835 (Editor)
Union Harmonist 1841 (Arranger)
The Juvenile Harmonist, 1842
The Seraphim or Sacred Harmonist, 1842
The Union Tune Book - revised and enlarged (Editor), ca.1842
David's Harp (settings for all 150 Psalms) 1844
British Psalmody, with Alexander Hume, pub.Edinburgh, 1844
The Union Tune Book, continuation, 1854

References

External links

1775 births
1859 deaths
Classical composers of church music
English classical composers
English Methodists
People from Canterbury
Shoemakers
Musicians from Kent
English male classical composers